In advertising, the effective frequency is the number of times a person must be exposed to an advertising message before a response is made and before exposure is considered wasteful.

The subject on effective frequency is quite controversial. Many people have their own definition on what this phrase means. There are also numerous studies with their own theories or models as to what the correct number is for effective frequency.

Various meanings 

There are several definitions of effective frequency. The following are some key examples:

 Advertising Glossary defines effective frequency as "Exposures to an advertising message required to achieve effective communication. Generally expressed as a range below which the exposure is inadequate and above which the exposure is considered wastage."
 Business Dictionary defines it as "Advertising, the theory that a consumer has to be exposed to an ad at least three times within a purchasing cycle (time between two consecutive purchases) to buy that product."
 Marketing Power defines it as "An advertiser's determination of the optimum number of exposure opportunities required to effectively convey the advertising message to the desired audience or target market."
 John Philip Jones says, "Effective frequency can mean that a single advertising exposure is able to influence the purchase of a brand. However, as all experienced advertising people know, the phrase was really coined to communicate the idea that there must be enough concentration of media weight to cross a threshold. Repetition was considered necessary, and there had to be enough of it within the period before a consumer buys a product to influence his or her choice of brand."

Models/theories

Ebbinghaus 
In 1879–80, Hermann Ebbinghaus conducted research on higher mental processes; he replicated the entire procedure in 1883–4.  Ebbinghaus' methods achieved a remarkable set of results.

He was the first to describe the shape of the learning curve. He reported that the time required to memorize an average nonsense syllable increases sharply as the number of syllables increases.

He discovered that distributing learning trials over time is more effective in memorizing nonsense syllables than massing practice into a single session; and he noted that continuing to practice material after the learning criterion has been reached enhances retention.

Using one of his methods called savings as an index, he showed that the most commonly accepted law of association, viz., association by contiguity (the idea that items next to one another are associated) had to be modified to include remote associations (associations between items that are not next to one another in a list).

He was the first to describe primacy and recency effects (the fact that early and late items in a list are more likely to be recalled than middle items), and to report that even a small amount of initial practice, far below that required for retention, can lead to savings at relearning.

He even addressed the question of memorization of meaningful material and estimated that learning such material takes only about one tenth of the effort required to learn comparable nonsense material.

This learning curve research has been used to help researches study advertising message retention.

Thomas Smith 

Thomas Smith wrote a guide called Successful Advertising in 1885. The saying he used is still being used today.

The first time people look at any given ad, they don't even see it.
The second time, they don't notice it.
The third time, they are aware that it is there.
The fourth time, they have a fleeting sense that they've seen it somewhere before.
The fifth time, they actually read the ad.
The sixth time they thumb their nose at it.
The seventh time, they start to get a little irritated with it.
The eighth time, they start to think, "Here's that confounded ad again."
The ninth time, they start to wonder if they're missing out on something.
The tenth time, they ask their friends and neighbors if they've tried it.
The eleventh time, they wonder how the company is paying for all these ads.
The twelfth time, they start to think that it must be a good product.
The thirteenth time, they start to feel the product has value.
The fourteenth time, they start to remember wanting a product exactly like this for a long time.
The fifteenth time, they start to yearn for it because they can't afford to buy it.
The sixteenth time, they accept the fact that they will buy it sometime in the future.
The seventeenth time, they make a note to buy the product.
The eighteenth time, they curse their poverty for not allowing them to buy this terrific product.
The nineteenth time, they count their money very carefully.
The twentieth time prospects see the ad, they buy what is offering.

Herbert E. Krugman 
Herbert E. Krugman wrote "Why Three Exposures may be enough" while he was employed at General Electric. His theory has been adopted and widely in use in the advertising arena. The following statement encapsulates his theory: "Let me try to explain the special qualities of one, two and three exposures. I stop at three because as you shall see there is no such thing as a fourth exposure psychologically; rather fours, fives, etc., are repeats of the third exposure effect.

According to Krugman, there are only three levels of exposure in psychological, not media, terms: Curiosity, recognition and decision.

Resources 

The following is a list of articles and books on the subject of various theories and models of advertising.

Books
Colin McDonald. What is the Short-term Effect of Advertising?. Marketing Science Institute – 1971 (Book)
Michael J. Naples. Effective Frequency. (Paperback)
A Sawyer and S Ward. Carry-over Effects in Advertising Communication: Evidence and Hypotheses from Behavioral Science. Marketing Science Institute. 1976 (Book)

Articles
 Batra, Rajeev, Donald R. Lehmann, Joanne Burke, and Jae Pae. "When Advertising Have An Impact? A Study of Tracking Data." Journal of Advertising Research 35, 5 (1995): 19–32
 Chessa, Antonio, and Jaap Murre. "A new memory model for ad impact and scheduling. Think of media impacts as incidents of learning. Then apply the maths of learning theory, and, hey presto! Guidelines for scheduling appear." Admap, 36(3; ISSU 145), 37–40.
 Craig, C. Samuel, Brian Sternthal, and Clark Leavite. "Advertising Wearout: An Experimental Analysis." Journal of Marketing Research 13, 4 (1976): 356–372
 Lawrence D. Gibson. "What Can One TV Exposure Do?" Journal of Advertising Research, Vol. 36, 1996
 Stephen J. Hoch, and John Deighton. "Managing What Consumers Learn from Experience." Journal of Marketing, Vol. 53, No. 2 (Apr., 1989), pp. 1–20
 John Philip Jones. "Ad Spending: Maintaining Market Share." Harvard Business Review 68, 1 (1990): 38–41
 John Philip Jones. "Single-Source Research Begins to Fulfill Its Promise." Journal of Advertising Research, Vol. 35, 1995
 Herbert E. Krugman. "The Impact of Television Advertising: Learning Without Involvement" Public Opinion Quarterly, volume 29, page 349, 1965.
 Herbert E. Krugman. "Why Three Exposures May Be Enough." Journal of Advertising Research 12, 6 (1972): 11–14
 Leonard M Lodish, Magid Abraham, Stuart Kalmenson, Jeanne Livelsberger, Beth Lubftkin, Bruce Richardson, and Mary Ellen Stevens. "How TV Advertising Works: A Meta-Analysis of 389 Real World Split Cable TV Advertising Experiments." Journal of Marketing Research 32, 2 (1995): 125–139
 Deborah MacInnis, Ambar Rao, Bernard Jaworski. "Advertising Context, Consumer Response and Brand Sales: Findings from Split-Cable Television Experiments." Working Paper. University of Southern California, 1997
 Cornelia Pechmann and David W. Stewart. "Loyalty and Brand Purchase: A Two Stage Model of Choice." Journal of Marketing Research 25, 2 (1988)
 Cornelia Pechmann and David W. Stewart. "Advertising Repetition: A Critical Review of Wearin and Wearout." Journal of Current Issues and Research in Advertising 11, 2 (1992): 285–330
 Gerard J. Tellis. "Advertising Exposure, Loyalty and Brand Purchase: A Two Stage Model of Choice." Journal of Marketing Research 25, 2 (1988) 138–144
 Hubert A. Zielske. "The Remembering and Forgetting of Advertising." Journal of Marketing, Vol. 23, No. 3 pp. 239–243 (Jan., 1959)

References 

Advertising
Audience measurement
Promotion and marketing communications